Mopti ( Fulfulde: 𞤁𞤭𞥅𞤱𞤢𞤤 𞤃𞤮𞥅𞤩𞤼𞤭𞥅,'' transliterated Diiwal Moobti) is the fifth administrative region of Mali, covering 79,017 km2.  Its capital is the city of Mopti. During the 2012 Northern Mali conflict, the frontier between Southern Mali which is controlled by the central government and the rebel-held North ran through Mopti Region.

Geography
Mopti Region is bordered by Tombouctou Region to the north, Ségou Region to the southwest, and Burkina Faso to the southeast.

The population in the 2009 census was 2,037,330. The region contains a number of ethnic groups including  Fulani, Malinke, and Bambara.

The Niger River crosses the region, and is joined by the Bani, an important tributary, at the city of Mopti.

The region is separated into several areas:  the Inland Niger Delta around Mopti, the Bandiagara cliffs and the plain of Bankass along the Burkina Faso frontier.  Mount Hombori, the highest point in Mali at 1153 meters, is in the Mopti Region, near the city of the same name.

In terms of its climate, Mopti Region is considered part of the Sahel.

The largest towns of the region are Mopti, Sévaré (which lies within Mopti Commune), Djenné, Bandiagara, Bankass, Douentza, and Youwarou.

Transportation and economy
An airport at Mopti provides air service for the region, while the Niger River provides transportation to Koulikoro and Ségou to the west and Tombouctou and Gao to the east.

The region is well-irrigated and its agriculture is well-developed, with particularly successful fishing.  Mopti serves as an important commercial crossroads between Mali's north, south and bordering nations.  Tourism is also well-developed, notably in the cities of Djenné and Mopti (the former of which boasts the Great Mosque of Djenné, the largest mud structure in the world) and in Dogon country.

History
Though Mopti's location, once a Bozo village named Sanga, had long been inhabited, rapid expansion began under Seku Amadu's Massina Empire around 1820.  Expansion continued under the Toucouleur Empire of El Hadj Umar Tall as well as the French colonial administration.

Culture 
The region is a melting pot, made up of various ethnic groups which live in harmony with one another.  Common languages of the area include Fulani, Dogon, Songhai, Bozo, Bambara and Tamashek.

Both the city of Djenné and the Bandiagara Escarpment have been named World Heritage Sites by UNESCO.

Administrative subdivisions

Mopti is divided into 8 Cercles encompassing 108 communes:

There are more than 1,000 villages in Mopti Region occupied by ethnic Dogon, Songhay, Fula, and other peoples.

See also
Dogon country
Regions of Mali
Cercles of Mali

References

External links

Official site for the Mopti Region. 
.

This article was significantly expanded from the corresponding article from the French Wikipedia, retrieved on July 10, 2005.

 
Regions of Mali
Massina Empire